Amphibia is a third album from French Instrumental Metal guitarist Patrick Rondat.

Track listing

Personnel
Patrice Guers - Bass
Tommy Aldridge - Drums
Patrick Rondat - Guitar
Phil Woindrich - Keyboards

References

External links
Check at Deezer
Amphibia at Discog
Discography at "Patrick Rondat - Site Officiel"
Deezer Music

1996 albums
Patrick Rondat albums